Zahran Palace (قصر زهران) is a palace in Amman, Jordan built in 1957 and has hosted many royal events such as the wedding of the current King and Queen of Jordan. In addition, celebrations of then Crown Prince Hamzah's wedding to Princess Noor was also held in this palace in May 2004. In 1959, it was the scene of the meeting between the then Shah of Persia (Iran) and the King of Jordan at the time.

The palace is located on Zahran Street (شارع زهران) in Jordan.

References

Palaces in Jordan